Argyrochosma dealbata, the powdery false cloak fern, is a small fern endemic to the central and southern United States. It grows on calcareous rocks, such as limestone. Its leaves are highly divided, with leaf segments joined by shiny, chestnut-brown axes, and their undersides are coated with white powder, giving the fern its name. First described as a species in 1814, it was transferred to the new genus Argyrochosma (the "false cloak ferns") in 1987, recognizing their distinctness from the "cloak ferns" (Notholaena sensu stricto).

Description

The rhizome is compact, more or less upright, and usually unbranching, and bears brown, pale brown or yellowish-brown scales that are uniform in color. It is rounded (rather than flattened or grooved) and lacks extensive hairs or scales; a few rhizome scales may be present at its base. The shiny brown color of the stipe continues into the rachis and the axis of the leaf segments, and blends with the leaf tissue at the base of each segment, without an abrupt end point. The rachis (leaf axis) is rounded or slightly flattened on the upper surface. The costae (pinna axes) are more or less straight. The axes tend to curl upwards when dry.

The leaf blades are deltate (triangular) or lanceolate, broadest at the base, and are most highly divided there, ranging from tripinnate (cut into pinnae, pinnules, and pinnulets) to pentapinnate (five times divided). They are roughly deltate in shape and attached to the rachis by a long stalk. The final divisions of the blade are oblong to ovate, and the dark color of the axes passes into their base, without a distinct joint. The blade tissue is bluish green and somewhat leafy in texture (rather than densely leathery); veins are often visible on the upper surface of the leaf. and a whitish (or rarely, yellowish) farina (powder) covers the underside, while the upper surface is free of hairs, powder, etc., although it may bear a few glands. The edges of leaf segments curl back under and partially protect the sori, which are borne along veins close to the edge. The sporangia contain 64 spores, released in summer and fall. Plants are sexual diploids, with a chromosome number of 2n = 54.

Taxonomy

Like many cheilanthoid ferns, this species has been placed in many genera at different times. It was first described by Pursh in 1814 as Cheilanthes dealbata, based on material collected on the banks of the Missouri River. The epithet dealbata, meaning "covered in white powder", refers to the coating of farina on the underside of the leaves. Gustav Kunze independently described the species as Notholaena pulchella in 1843. His specimen was collected for the Berlin Botanical Garden from rocks in Missouri. Initially misidentified as Notholaena nivea, he noted that the Missouri material was smaller and more highly divided, and commented on the white powder on the underside of the leaves, lacking in Pursh's description. The epithet pulchella means "small and beautiful". He subsequently recognized it as synonymous with C. dealbata and transferred the older name to Notholaena as N. dealbata in 1848, noting that he "would not have looked for it under Cheilanthes".

Delineating natural genera in the cheilanthoids has proven to be extremely difficult, and other placements of the species were subsequently put forward. Fée transferred it to Cincinalis as Cincinalis dealbata in 1852, breaking with most other authorities in recognizing and re-circumscribing that genus. In 1859, Mettenius rejected Fée's attempt to delineate Cincinalis as a separate genus, but recognized the genus Gymnogramma for species where sporangia were borne along the nerves and not densely clustered at the end of the nerves. He transferred the species there as G. dealbata, but this name had already been used by Presl for a different species in 1825, rendering it illegitimate. Prantl expanded Pellaea to include several genera in which he perceived close affinities, including Cincinalis. Accordingly, he transferred C. dealbata to Pellaea section Cincinalis as P. dealbata in 1882. George Edward Davenport lumped it as a variety of N. nivea, N. nivea var. dealbata, in 1883.

By the late 20th century, most authorities favored placement of Notholaena nivea and closely related ferns, including N. dealbata, either in Notholaena or Pellaea. Both Edwin Copeland and C. A. Weatherby suggested in the 1940s that this group of ferns might represent a distinct genus of its own. This was finally addressed in 1987 by Michael D. Windham, who was carrying out phylogenetic studies of these genera. He elevated Notholaena sect. Argyrochosma to become the genus Argyrochosma, and transferred this species to that genus as A. dealbata. In 2018, Maarten J. M. Christenhusz transferred the species to Hemionitis as H. artax (the epithet dealbata was preoccupied), as part of a program to consolidate the cheilanthoid ferns into that genus. The epithet refers to the horse of Atreyu in the novel The Neverending Story.

Phylogenetic studies have shown that A. dealbata is a sister species to A. limitanea, of the southwestern United States and northern Mexico; these two species form a clade sister to another clade of several South American species.

Species of Argyrochosma are commonly referred to as "false cloak ferns"; the name apparently refers to their resemblance to Notholaena proper, known as "cloak ferns" for the reflexed leaf margins, which cloak the sporangia.

Distribution and habitat
Argyrochosma dealbata is endemic to the United States. It is found from the western edge of Illinois south and west through Arkansas and Missouri to southeastern Nebraska and thence south through Kansas and Oklahoma to Texas, with a disjunct station in south-central Kentucky.

It grows in the crevices of cliffs or ledges of calcareous rock.

Conservation
Under the NatureServe conservation status system, A. dealbata is ranked as apparently secure (G4), but it is considered imperiled in Arkansas and Oklahoma, and the single occurrences in Nebraska and Kentucky are considered extirpated and historical, respectively.

Cultivation
Kunze suggested the species was suitable for cultivation, noting that it was grown in Berlin in a well-lit part of the greenhouses. George Schneider suggested it required "cool treatment", perhaps in contrast to the desert-dwelling members of the genus. It has been described as preferring medium light, and relatively dry, well-drained soil mixed with sand, perhaps of high pH.

Notes and references

Notes

References

Works cited

External links

Pictures and description of an A. dealbata occurrence

dealbata
Plants described in 1814
Ferns of the United States
Endemic flora of the United States